Taylor Spivey (born 1991) is an American professional triathlete. At the conclusion of the 2019 season she placed fourth in the ITU World Triathlon Series in the behind Katie Zaferes, Jess Learmonth, and Georgia Taylor-Brown. This followed up an 8th place series finish in 2018, 12th in 2017 and 50th in 2016. Spivey competes at Elite pro level in the ITU Triathlon World Cup, ITU World Triathlon Series, Grand Prix de Triathlon, American Triathlon Confederation (CAMTRI) and Super League Triathlon competitions.

Career
Spivey is the daughter of Mark Spivey and Bonnie Spivey. In interviews she has credited her parents with her introduction to triathlon, with her mother having a former career as a professional long course (Ironman) triathlete and her father also competing at Ironman distance as an age-group athlete. Indeed, it is understood that her mother was pregnant with Taylor whilst competing at Ironman distance. Born in Southern California, her background is in surf lifesaving. She took up short course (sprint and standard distance) triathlon in college.

Spivey attended Mira Costa High School, and went on to study Architecture at California Polytechnic State University, graduating with a BA Architecture (cum laude).

Spivey competes at Elite pro level in the ITU Triathlon World Cup, ITU World Triathlon Series, Grand Prix de Triathlon, American Triathlon Confederation (CAMTRI) and Super League Triathlon competitions. All of these competitions are short course (sprint and standard distance triathlon at world cup and ITU World Triathlon Series level) although in interviews she has expressed an interest in competing in middle distance (half-iron distance) triathlons in the future.

Spivey trains with The Triathlon Squad, a training group headed by lead coach Paulo Sousa and composed of a mix of American and international athletes. She is also a member of Poissy Triathlon, a professional triathlon team which competes as part of the French Triathlon Grand Prix.

Spivey has enjoyed a successful start to her 2022 Super League Triathlon Season with podium finishes at the first four races of the season, including taking the top spot at her home race, at SLT Malibu 2022. She finished fourth in the final event of the series, in NEOM Saudi Arabia, a performance which secured 2nd place in the series overall.

ITU World Triathlon Series competitions 
Spivey's ITU World Triathlon Series race results are:

ITU Triathlon World Cup competitions 
Spivey's ITU Triathlon World Cup Series race results are:;

American Triathlon Confederation competitions 
Spivey's American Triathlon Confederation (CAMTRI) race results are:;

Super League Triathlon competitions 
Spivey's Super League Triathlon race results are:

References

Living people
American female triathletes
1991 births
21st-century American women
Mira Costa High School alumni